Agent-assisted automation is a type of call center technology that automates elements of what the call center agent 1) does with his/her desktop tools and/or 2) says to customers during the call using pre-recorded audio. It is a relatively new category of call center technology that shows promise in improving call center productivity and compliance.

Types of agent-assisted automation

Desktop integration

Desktop integration is focused on how the agents interact with their desktop tools. The main challenge is that there are often many desktop tools, some new, some legacy system. These tools can make the process of handling customers’ requests quite cumbersome and time consuming. That time on the phone can often be frustrating for customers and expensive for companies. By using software to integrate the tools, the process can be streamlined. For example, information can be entered once and populated across multiple tools or doing a step in one tool can automatically accomplish a different step in another desktop tool.

Pre-recorded audio

Pre-recorded audio (sometimes referred to as soundboard (computer program) or as soundboard technology) is another form of agent-assisted automation. The purpose of using pre-recorded messages is to increase the probability (and in some cases error-proof the process so) that the right information is provided to customers at the right time. The required disclosures are pre-recorded to ensure accuracy and understandability. By integrating the recordings with the customer relationship management software, the right combination of disclosures can be played based on the combination of goods and services the customer purchased. The integration with the customer relationship management software also ensures that the order cannot be submitted until the disclosures are played, essentially error-proofing (poka-yoke) the process of ensuring the customer gets all the required consumer protection information.

Phone surveys are ideal applications of this technology. Whether surveying market preferences or political views, the pre-recorded audio with an agent listening allows the questions to be asked in the same way every time, uninfluenced by the agents' fatigue levels, accents, or their own views.

Fraud prevention

Fraud prevention is a specialized type of agent-assisted automation focused on reducing ID theft and credit card fraud. ID theft and credit card fraud are huge threats for call centers and their customers and few good solutions exist, but new agent-assisted automation solutions are producing promising results. The technology allows the agents to remain on the phone while the customers use their phone key pads to enter the information. The tones are masked and the information passes directly into the customer relationship management system or payment gateway in the case of credit card transactions. The automation essentially makes it impossible for call center agents and also call center personnel that might be monitoring the calls to steal the credit card number, social security number, or other personally identifiable information.

Outbound telemarketing

Another specialized application space of agent-assisted automation is in outbound telemarketing, which goes under numerous headings including outbound prospecting, cold calling, solicitation, fund-raising, etc. Turnover is high among agents engaged in this kind of work because the task is tedious and emotionally difficult. It is tedious because you spend the bulk of your day, not talking to qualified leads, but in getting wrong numbers and answering machines. As good and as ubiquitous as predictive dialing technology has become, it still makes a lot of mistakes because the phone number inputs are outdated. It is emotionally difficult work because, beyond the tedium, you spend a lot of time hearing the word “No!”, getting hung-up on, and cussed at. The pre-recorded audio allows you to dispense with wrong numbers and answering machines while you move onto the next call. Agents can easily handle two or three overlapping calls, an immediate productivity hit. Additionally, agents using the technology don’t seem to take the gruff treatment as personally. They report that it feels as if the customer is saying “no” to the software, not to them. Finally, contribution amounts and conversion rates can be improved by adding some intelligence into the scripts, for example by raising and lowering the initial contribution amount based on the wealth of the area you are calling into or using pre-recorded audio with different accents, Southern when calling in the South, for example.  Another benefit of the technology is that it enables the work to be done by lower cost agents in offshore locations.

Benefits
Just as automation has benefited manufacturing by reducing the mental and physical effort required of workers while simultaneously improving throughput, quality, and safety, agent-assisted automation is improving call center results while reducing the tiring aspects of the job for agents.

In some cases, the agent-assisted automation streamlines the process and allows calls to be handled more quickly. By eliminating cutting and pasting from one application to another, by auto-navigating applications, and by providing a single view of the customer, agent-assisted automation can reduce call handle time and increase agent productivity.

Second, in theory, the more steps that can be automated and the more logic that can be built into the call flow (e.g., if the customer buys items 2 and 9, then disclosures a, c, and f are read by the pre-recorded audio), then companies may be able to reduce the amount of training that is required of the agents while at the same time ensuring more consistency and accuracy. However, no published studies have reported this result yet.

But an even larger problem in call centers is between-agent variation in behavior and results. Agents differ in the amount of training and coaching they receive, they differ in the amount of experience they have, their jobs are repetitious and tiring, and the process and procedures the agents are supposed to follow constantly change. Moreover, there are significant individual differences between agents in their intelligence, personality, motivations, etc. which all affect performance. Despite the large amount of money call centers have spent over decades trying to reduce between-agent variation, the problem is still so prevalent that one large study of customer interactions with call centers found that a customer’s experience was completely a function of the quality of the agent who happened to answer the phone.

Therefore, the most significant benefit of agent-assisted automation may prove to be in how the automation error-proofs or poka-yoke the process and ensures that something that needs to be done or said happens every time. Properly implemented, the between-agent variation for whatever step of the process the automation is applied to may be able to be reduced to near zero. This is especially important in a collection agency whose processes and procedures are closely regulated by the Fair Debt Collection Practices Act.

References 

Computer telephony integration
&
Workflow technology